Patrick Alfred Terry (2 October 1933 – 23 February 2007) was an English professional football centre forward who made nearly 500 appearances for 9 Football League clubs, most notably Gillingham, Reading and Millwall. He was described as a player whose "game was built on the understanding that no quarter was asked or given, as he let nothing stand in his way in pursuit of a goal".

Honours 
Millwall

 Football League Fourth Division: 1961–62

Career statistics

References

1933 births
2007 deaths
Footballers from Lambeth
Association football forwards
English footballers
Eastbourne United F.C. players
Charlton Athletic F.C. players
Newport County A.F.C. players
Swansea City A.F.C. players
Gillingham F.C. players
Northampton Town F.C. players
Millwall F.C. players
Reading F.C. players
Swindon Town F.C. players
Brentford F.C. players
Hillingdon Borough F.C. players
Wimbledon F.C. players
Folkestone F.C. players
Stevenage Athletic F.C. players
Greenwich Borough F.C. players
English Football League players
Southern Football League players